Bankino is a rural locality (a selo) in Veydelevsky District, Belgorod Oblast, Russia. The population was 171 as of 2010. There are 3 streets.

Geography 
Bankino is located 24 km east of Veydelevka (the district's administrative centre) by road. Galushki is the nearest rural locality.

References 

Rural localities in Veydelevsky District